On Borrowed Time is a 1939 film about the role death plays in life, and how humanity cannot live without it. It is adapted from Paul Osborn's 1938 Broadway hit play. The play, based on a novel by Lawrence Edward Watkin, has been revived twice on Broadway since its original run.

The story is a retelling of a Greek fable in which Death is tricked into climbing a pear tree which had been blessed by Saint Polycarp to trap anyone who was trying to steal an old woman's pears. The opening credits attribute the tale to Geoffrey Chaucer. "Mr. Chaucer liked the tale and believed it—and so do we. If perchance you don't believe it, we respectfully insist that we and Mr. Chaucer must be right. Because faith still performs miracles and a good deed does find its just reward." According to TCM.com, this probably refers to Chaucer's "The Pardoner's Tale".

Set in small-town America, the film stars Lionel Barrymore, Beulah Bondi and Sir Cedric Hardwicke. Barrymore plays crotchety wheelchair-using Julian Northrup ("Gramps"), who smokes a smelly pipe, cherishes a smelly dog, prefers fishing to churchgoing, occasionally takes a nip of "tonic" and indulges in mild profanity. (Barrymore had broken his hip twice and was reliant on a wheelchair at the time.) Gramps and his wife, Nellie, played by Bondi, are raising their orphaned grandson, Pud, who adores his grandfather and mimics everything he does. Hardwicke plays Mr. Brink, the elegant and aloof personification of death.

Plot
Mr. Brink takes Pud's (Bobs Watson) parents in an auto wreck. Gramps gives generously to the minister who delivered the eulogy, and Pud tells Gramps that because he has done a good deed, he can make a wish. Boys are constantly stealing Gramps' apples. He and Pud chase the latest perpetrator away; he wishes that anyone who climbs up the tree will have to stay there until he permits them to climb down. Later, Pud inadvertently tests the wish, letting go of a branch only when Gramps says he can.

Pud's blue-nosed busybody Aunt Demetria (Eily Malyon), known to Gramps and Pud as a "pismire" ("the meanest ant there is"), has designs on Pud and his inheritance. Her condoling drives the boy to tears and Gramps to a near-fatal heart attack. While Pud fetches a glass of water, Mr. Brink comes for Gramps: It is time to go "where the woodbine twineth," the words Gramps used to tell Pud about death. Gramps refuses: Pud needs him. Mr. Brink vanishes when Miss Nellie calls. Pud returns and asks who the stranger was.

Miss Nellie feels her age and worries about Gramps' influence on Pud. They quarrel, and Mr. Brink takes her peacefully, just before Gramps comes in to apologize. He is inconsolable until their housekeeper, Marcia (Una Merkel), tells him Miss Nellie's last words:  "Always see that Julian has his pipe." Reinvigorated, Gramps sees a lawyer about picking a future guardian for Pud, only to learn that Demetria is going to court to adopt the boy now.

When Mr. Brink returns for Gramps, the old man knows who it is and, to Pud's delight, tricks Mr. Brink into fetching an apple. While stuck in the tree, he cannot take Gramps—or anyone else. The only way anything can die is by touching the tree—as does their beloved dog, Betty. Gramps has a fence put up around the deadly tree.

Demetria plots to have Gramps committed to a psychiatric hospital when he claims that Death, now invisible, is trapped in his apple tree. Only Pud and Gramps can hear him. Gramps proves his story by holding a gun on his friend, Dr. Evans (Henry Travers), and Grimes the orderly (Nat Pendleton), who has come to take him to the asylum. Gramps demands that the doctor kill a fly. He can't. Gramps shoots Grimes, who wakes up in the hospital hungry instead of dead. Elsewhere in the hospital, three patients are "on the brink, but they're holding their own."

Dr. Evans becomes a believer, but he tries to convince Gramps to let Death down so suffering people can find release. Gramps refuses, so the doctor arranges for the local sheriff to commit him. Pud is to be delivered to Demetria. Gramps realizes that sooner or later he will have to give in. He tries to say goodbye to a distraught Pud, who runs away.

A bird flies into the tree and dies. With Marcia's help, and over Mr. Brink's protests, Gramps tricks Demetria and the Sheriff into believing they are scheduled to go with Mr. Brink. They beg Gramps to convince Mr. Brink otherwise, and Demetria vows never to bother Gramps or Pud again. Marcia and Gramps search for Pud to tell him the good news. 

Mr. Brink sees Pud in the yard and dares him to look him in the eye. Pud climbs to the top of the fence and falls. His agonizing injuries would be fatal, if Death were there to take him. Holding Pud in his lap, Gramps asks Mr. Brink: "Please come down and take us both." They find they can walk again. They walk together up a beautiful country lane... "Gee it smells good here Gramps." "That's the woodbine, sonny. How long we going to be here Mr. Brink?" "For Eternity" "How long is Eternity, Gramps?" "That's a right smart piece of time, boy." They hear Miss Nellie calling to them from beyond a brilliant light. "Coming Miss Nellie, Coming!" "Coming Grandma!" Betty runs, barking, to meet them.

The closing text reads: "And so they lived happily for all eternity—which, as Gramps would say, is a right smart piece of time."

Cast 
 Lionel Barrymore as Julian Northrup (Gramps) 
 Sir Cedric Hardwicke as Mr. Brink 
 Beulah Bondi as Nellie Northrup (Granny to Pud, Miss Nellie to Gramps)
 Una Merkel as Marcia Giles, the Northrups' housekeeper 
 Bobs Watson as John 'Pud' Northrup 
 Nat Pendleton as Mr. Grimes 
 Henry Travers as Dr. James Evans 
 Grant Mitchell as Ben Pilbeam, Gramps' lawyer 
 Eily Malyon as Demetria Riffle 
 James Burke as Sheriff Burlingame 
 Charles Waldron as Reverend Murdock 
 Ian Wolfe as Charles Wentworth 
 Phillip Terry as Bill Lowry, Ben Pilbeam's assistant and Marcia's boyfriend 
 Truman Bradley as James Northrup
 Barbara Bedford as Mrs. James Northrup (uncredited)

Reception
In his July 7, 1939, review in The New York Times, Frank S. Nugent says that the film "isn't nearly so effective on the screen as it was on the stage", pointing out the "Hays code required the toning down of the salty dialogue that was at once the most comically shocking and endearing virtue" of Gramps and Pud.  According to Nugent:

Production 
Frank Morgan was originally slated to play Gramps, until Barrymore convinced the studio he could play the part in spite of his disability.

Gramps is a veteran of the Civil War—he observes that they told him he was too young to serve—and of the Spanish–American War—he refers to Battle of San Juan Hill.

Early in the film, Mr. Brink tells Gramps he is there to take him "where the woodbine twineth." This is a reference to an 1870 poem by Septimus Winner (under the pseudonym Apsley Street) euphemizing death, heaven, and the afterlife.  Gramps dismissively tells Mr. Brink that's what people say to children. Gramps would have been a child himself around the 1870s, and would likely have heard that phrase in a popular song of that era.

References

External links 
 
 
 
 
 1952 Best Plays radio adaptation of original play at Internet Archive
 1946 Theatre Guild on the Air radio adaptation of original play at Internet Archive
 

1939 films
1930s fantasy films
American fantasy films
American black-and-white films
Films about wish fulfillment
Films scored by Franz Waxman
American films based on plays
Films directed by Harold S. Bucquet
Metro-Goldwyn-Mayer films
Films about personifications of death
1930s English-language films
1930s American films